is a Japanese actor who is affiliated with both Artist Box and Fireworks. He graduated from Osaka Municipal Sakuranomiya High School's Physical Education.

Filmography

TV series

Films

References

External links
 Official profile at Artist Box 
 Official profile at Fireworks 

1982 births
Living people
People from Moriguchi, Osaka
Male actors from Osaka Prefecture